Robert Fabián Herrera Rosas (born 1 March 1989 in Montevideo)  is a Uruguayan footballer who plays as a defender for River Plate.

Honours
Uruguayan Primera División (3): Runner-Up 2009, 2011, 2012
Uruguayan Primera División Torneo Clausura (2): 2009, 2012
Uruguayan Primera División Torneo Apertura (1): 2010

References

External links
 
 

1989 births
Living people
Footballers from Montevideo
Uruguayan footballers
Uruguay under-20 international footballers
Uruguayan expatriate footballers
Association football defenders
Uruguayan Primera División players
Liga MX players
Ecuadorian Serie A players
Defensor Sporting players
Club Puebla players
C.F. Pachuca players
Barcelona S.C. footballers
Peñarol players
Club Atlético River Plate (Montevideo) players
South American Youth Championship players
Uruguayan expatriate sportspeople in Mexico
Uruguayan expatriate sportspeople in Ecuador
Expatriate footballers in Mexico
Expatriate footballers in Ecuador